Feldmoching-Hasenbergl (Central Bavarian: Fejdmoching-Hosnbeagl) is a borough in the northern part of the city of Munich in Bavaria, Germany. It contains the S-Bahn railway station of München-Feldmoching.

Location 
Feldmoching-Hasenbergl is surrounded by: Allach-Untermenzing, Moosach and Milbertshofen-Am Hart in the south, and Karlsfeld and Oberschleißheim in the north.

Description 
It contains four lakes, the Lerchenauer See, Fasaneriesee, Feldmochinger See (Dreiseenplatte) and Landschaftssee Allacher Lohe as well as part of the Oberschleißheim regatta course. Green areas include Panzerwiese, Schwarzhölzl and Hartelholz.

References

Boroughs of Munich